William Hinde (1569?–1629) was an English priest and author, of Puritan views.

Life
Born at Kendal, Westmoreland, about 1569, he entered The Queen's College, Oxford, in Michaelmas term 1586 as a servitor; he was elected successively tabarder and perpetual fellow. He graduated with Bachelor of Arts (BA) on 2 July 1591, and Oxford Master of Arts (MA Oxon) 2 July 1594.

About 1603, he became perpetual curate of Bunbury, Cheshire. He was a leader of the nonconformists in Cheshire, and clashed with Thomas Morton as bishop of Chester. Hinde died at Bunbury in June 1629, and was buried there.

Works
An admirer of John Rainolds, Hinde edited his Prophecie of Obadiah opened and applyed in sundry … sermons, Oxford, 1613, and The Discovery of the Man of Sinne … preached in divers sermons, Oxford, 1614. With John Dod he wrote Bathshebaes Instructions to her sonne Lemuel: containing a fruitfull … exposition of the last chapter of Proverbs, London, 1614. 

His own writings include:
 ‘A Path to Pietie, leading to the Way, the Truth, and the Life, Christ Jesus,’ Oxford, 1613. 
 ‘The Office and Use of the Moral Law of God in the days of the Gospel justified and explained at large,’ &c., London, 1623. 
 ‘A faithful Remonstrance: or the Holy Life and Happy Death of John Bruen of Bruen-Stapleford, in the County of Chester, Esq.,’ London, 1641, published by Hinde's son Samuel, who was chaplain to Charles II and incumbent of the Church of St Mary the Virgin, Dover.

Family
John Bruen was probably Hinde's brother-in-law; Hinde's wife Margaret is thought to be a daughter of William Foxe, whose daughter Anne married Bruen as his second wife. Hinde and his wife had nine children who survived.

References

Attribution

1569 births
1629 deaths
English Jacobean nonconforming clergy